The 22816 / 15 Ernakulam–Bilaspur Express is a Superfast Express train that runs between  and . The train belongs to the South East Central Railway zone of  Indian Railways.

It operates as train number 22816 from Ernakulam Junction to Bilaspur Junction and as train number 22815 in the reverse direction, serving the states of Kerala, Tamil Nadu, Andhra Pradesh, Telangana, Maharashtra & Chhattisgarh.

Coaches
The 22816 / 15 Ernakulam–Bilaspur Express has one AC 2-tier, two AC 3-tier, 12 sleeper class, four general unreserved & two SLR (seating with luggage rake) coaches and two high capacity parcel van coaches. It does not carry a pantry car.

As is customary with most train services in India, coach composition may be amended at the discretion of Indian Railways depending on demand.

Service

As the average speed of the train is below , as per railway rules, its fare doesn't includes a Superfast surcharge.

Routing

Traction
As the route is fully electrified, a Bhilai Electric Loco Shed-based WAP-7 locomotive powers the train for its entire journey.

References

External links
22816 Ernakulam Bilaspur Express at India Rail Info
22815 Bilaspur Ernakulam Express at India Rail Info

Express trains in India
Transport in Kochi
Rail transport in Kerala
Rail transport in Tamil Nadu
Rail transport in Andhra Pradesh
Rail transport in Telangana
Rail transport in Maharashtra
Rail transport in Chhattisgarh
Transport in Bilaspur, Chhattisgarh